John Noel Eddy (14 March 1915 – 16 April 1981) was a British sailor. He competed in the 8 Metre event at the 1936 Summer Olympics.

References

External links
 

1915 births
1981 deaths
British male sailors (sport)
Olympic sailors of Great Britain
Sailors at the 1936 Summer Olympics – 8 Metre
Place of birth missing